New Angouleme May refer to:

 New Angoulême, a place in New York City
 New Angouleme, a commune developed by Anne Marie Javouhey